Monino Airfield is a former military air base of the Soviet Air Force in Monino, Moscow Oblast, Russia. Monino Airfield was decommissioned from active service with the Soviet Air Force in 1956, however, the presence of the Gagarin Air Force Academy in Monino meant the air base's facilities saw minor usage, including a military technical school with an operations ramp which during the 1990s had an Ilyushin Il-76 freighter jet and two bombers. In 1958, construction of the Central Air Force Museum began on an unused section of Monino Airfield's grounds and opened in 1960, which has since expanded as new aircraft have been added to the collection. The remaining facilities of the air base, including the runway, are now abandoned.

References
RussianAirFields.com

Soviet Air Force bases
Russian Air Force bases
Buildings and structures in Moscow Oblast